Madeleine Fiona Arlett (born 7 June 1994) is a British rower. She won the British Championship U23 lightweight single scull three years in a row.

Arlett was named Senior rower of the year in November 2015 at the annual Scottish Rowing Awards.

In 2019, Arlett won a bronze medal at the World Rowing Championships in Ottensheim, Austria in the lightweight single sculls.

References

External links
 
 Maddie Arlett at British Rowing
 Maddie Arlett at Scottish Rowing
 

1994 births
Living people
British female rowers
World Rowing Championships medalists for Great Britain